S. fulgida may refer to:

 Sadies fulgida, a jumping spider
 Sagra fulgida, a frog-legged beetle
 Schwartziella fulgida, a sea snail
 Seguenzia fulgida, a sea snail
 Swima fulgida, a bristle worm